Chatuchak is a khwaeng (subdistrict) of Chatuchak District, Bangkok, Thailand. It is a location of the district office.

History
The name Chatuchak after Chatuchak Park, a public park was built on the occasion of King Bhumibol Adulyadej (Rama IX)'s fourth cycle (48 years old) anniversary (Chatuchak means "fourth cycle"). In late 2003 it was officially declared a subdistrict along with four other subdistricts in Chatuchak.

Geography
Chatuchak is an area in the southwest of the district. It is bounded by (from the north clockwise): Lat Yao in its district (Ratchadaphisek Road is a borderline), Chomphon in its district (Phaholyothin Road is a borderline), Phaya Thai in Phaya Thai District (Khlong Bang Sue is a borderline), Bang Sue in Bang Sue District (Khlong Prapa and Southern Railway Line are the borderlines).

Places

Chatuchak Park
Chatuchak Weekend Market (JJ Market)
Vachirabenjatas Park (Rot Fai Park)
Queen Sirikit Park
Children's Discovery Museum Bangkok 1
JJ Mall
CentralPlaza Lardprao
Centara Grand at Central Plaza Ladprao Bangkok
Hall of Railway Heritage (closed)
Ministry of Energy and PTT Headquarters
International Civil Aviation Organization (ICAO) Asia and Pacific Office
Or Tor Kor Market
Horwang School
Princess Mother 84 Garden

Transportation
Mo Chit Station
Chatuchak Park Station
Kamphaeng Phet Station
Phahon Yothin Station
Ha Yaek Lat Phrao Station
Chatuchak Station
Bang Sue Grand Station
Bang Sue Junction Railway Station
Nikhom Rotfai km 11 Railway Halt
Bangkok Bus Terminal (Chatuchak), familiarly called Mo Chit 2 or New Mo Chit

Cites

Subdistricts of Bangkok
Chatuchak district